The Lake Pontchartrain Causeway, also known simply as The Causeway, is a fixed link composed of two parallel bridges crossing Lake Pontchartrain in southeastern Louisiana, United States. The southern terminus of the causeway is in Metairie, Louisiana, a south shore suburb of New Orleans. The northern terminus is in Mandeville, Louisiana, a north shore suburb of New Orleans.

From 1969 until 2011, it was listed by Guinness World Records as the longest bridge over water in the world; in 2011, in response to the opening of the longer Jiaozhou Bay Bridge in China, Guinness World Records created two categories for bridges over water: continuous and aggregate lengths over water. Lake Pontchartrain Causeway then became the longest bridge over water (continuous), while Jiaozhou Bay Bridge the longest bridge over water (aggregate).

The bridges are supported by 9,500 concrete pilings.

History
The idea of a bridge spanning Lake Pontchartrain dates back to the early 19th century and Bernard de Marigny, the founder of Mandeville.  He started a ferry service that continued to operate into the mid-1930s. In the 1920s, a proposal called for the creation of artificial islands that would then be linked by a series of bridges. The financing for this plan would come from selling home sites on the islands.  The modern causeway started to take form in 1948 when Ernest M. Loëb Jr. envisioned the project.  Due to his lobbying and vision, the Louisiana Legislature created what is now the Causeway Commission. The Louisiana Bridge Company was formed to construct the bridge, which in turn appointed James E. Walters Sr. to direct the project. Ernest M Loëb was assisted by his nephew, Ernest M. Loëb III, president of Ernest M. Loëb & Company to plan the construction of the bridge

It opened in 1956 at a cost of $46 million (equivalent to $ million in  dollars). This included not just the bridge, but three approach roads on the north end and a long stretch of road on the south end.

On June 16, 1964, six people died when barges tore a gap in the bridge and a bus plunged into the lake.

A parallel two-lane span,  longer than the original, opened on May 10, 1969, at a cost of $30 million (equivalent to $ million in  dollars).

Since its construction, the causeway has operated as a toll bridge. Until 1999, tolls were collected from traffic going in each direction. To alleviate congestion on the south shore, toll collections were eliminated on the northbound span. In May 1999, the standard tolls for cars changed from $1.50 in each direction to a $3 toll collected on the North Shore for southbound traffic. In 2017, the toll was raised to fund safety improvements on the bridge. The toll changed from $3.00 with cash and $2.00 with a toll tag to $5.00 with cash and $3.00 with a toll tag.

The opening of the causeway boosted the fortunes of small North Shore communities by reducing drive time into New Orleans by up to 50 minutes, bringing the North Shore into the New Orleans metropolitan area. Prior to the causeway, residents of St. Tammany Parish used either the Maestri Bridge on U.S. Route 11 or the Rigolets Bridge on U.S. Route 90, both near Slidell, Louisiana; or on the west side, via U.S. Route 51 through Manchac, Louisiana.

After Hurricane Katrina on August 29, 2005, videos collected showed damage to the bridge. The storm surge was not as high under the causeway as it was near the I-10 Twin Span Bridge, and damage was mostly limited to the turnarounds.  A total of 17 spans were lost on that bridge but  the structural foundations remained intact. The causeways have never sustained major damage of any sort from hurricanes or other natural occurrences, a rarity among causeways.  The existing fiber optic cable plant was blown out of its tray but remained intact per optical time domain reflectometer (OTDR) analysis. With the I-10 Twin Span Bridge severely damaged, the causeway was used as a major route for recovery teams staying in lands to the north to get into New Orleans. The causeway reopened first to emergency traffic and then to the general public – with tolls suspended – on September 19, 2005. Tolls were reinstated by mid-October of that year.

The others are, in order from longest to shortest, the Manchac Swamp bridge on I-55, the Atchafalaya Basin Bridge on I-10, the Louisiana Highway 1 Bridge, the Bonnet Carré Spillway Bridge on I-10, the Chacahoula Swamp Bridge on U.S. 90, the Lake Pontchartrain Twin Spans on I-10, and the LaBranche Wetlands Bridge on I-310.

The southern end of the Manchac Swamp Bridge (on the western edge of Lake Pontchartrain) is the western end of the I-10 Bonnet Carré Spillway Bridge (on the southwestern edge of Lake Pontchartrain), and the northern end of the LaBranche Wetlands Bridge is the eastern end of the I-10 Bonnet Carré Spillway Bridge; so these three bridges, by name, are in fact one contiguous bridge.

The bridge was designated as a National Historic Civil Engineering Landmark by the American Society of Civil Engineers in 2013.

Guinness World Records controversy 
For decades Lake Pontchartrain Causeway was listed by Guinness World Records as the longest bridge over water in the world. In July 2011 the Jiaozhou Bay Bridge in China was named by Guinness World Records as the 'longest bridge over water'. At that time there was some controversy in the United States as supporters of the former holder of the record, the Lake Pontchartrain Causeway, disagreed with Guinness World Records not calling the causeway the longest. Supporters made this claim based on its own definition i.e., the length of a bridge physically over water and concluded that the Lake Pontchartrain Causeway spans , and was therefore the longest. The Jiaozhou Bay Bridge spans water for only . Following this controversy in July 2011, Guinness World Records created two categories for bridges over water: continuous and aggregate lengths over water. Lake Pontchartrain Causeway then became the longest bridge over water (continuous), while Jiaozhou Bay Bridge became the longest bridge over water (aggregate).

See also

List of bridges in the United States
List of longest bridges in the world
Megaproject
Prestressed concrete

References

External links

The Causeway website
https://web.archive.org/web/20090806091006/https://library.rice.edu/collections/WRC/finding-aids/manuscripts/0488
Historic American Engineering Record (HAER) documentation, filed under Causeway Boulevard, Metairie, Jefferson Parish, LA:

Bascule bridges in the United States
Toll bridges in Louisiana
Bridges completed in 1956
Bridges completed in 1969
Buildings and structures in Jefferson Parish, Louisiana
Buildings and structures in St. Tammany Parish, Louisiana
Transportation in the New Orleans metropolitan area
Causeways in the United States
Roads in Louisiana
Road bridges in Louisiana
Transportation in St. Tammany Parish, Louisiana
Transportation in Jefferson Parish, Louisiana
Tourist attractions in Jefferson Parish, Louisiana
Tourist attractions in St. Tammany Parish, Louisiana
Concrete bridges in the United States
Trestle bridges in the United States
Historic American Engineering Record in Louisiana
Historic Civil Engineering Landmarks